William José Tesillo Gutiérrez (born 2 February 1990) is a Colombian professional footballer who plays as a centre-back for Liga MX club León and the Colombia national team. He also plays as a left-back.

Club career

Early career
Born in Barranquilla, Tesillo represented mainly Boca Juniors de Cali as a youth. In 2009, he joined Centauros Villavicencio in the Categoría Primera B, and made his senior debut for the club during the year. His first goal came on 21 March 2009, in a 1–3 away loss against Atlético.

Deportes Quindío
In 2010, Tesillo moved to Categoría Primera A side Deportes Quindío, along with three other Centauros teammates. He made his debut in the category on 4 April, starting in a 0–1 away loss against Boyacá Chicó.

Tesillo scored his first goal in the top tier on 8 May 2011, netting his team's third in a 4–3 home success over Deportivo Pereira. An undisputed starter for the club, and left with 134 official appearances.

Junior
On 19 December 2013, Tesillo signed a one-year loan deal with fellow top-tier club Junior. He made his debut for the club the following 25 January, coming on as a late substitute for Luis Enrique Quiñones in a 3–2 win at Atlético Huila.

Tesillo became an undisputed starter at the club, and had his loan extended for a further year in December 2014. He left the club after his loan expired, and the club opted to not activate his buyout clause.

Santa Fe
On 29 December 2015, Tesillo signed a three-year contract with Independiente Santa Fe. He made his debut for the club on 31 January of the following year by playing the full 90 minutes in a 1–0 win at Boyacá Chicó.

Immediately a first-choice, Tesillo scored his first goal on 21 February 2016, but in a 1–2 away loss against Envigado. He contributed with a career-best four goals in 36 appearances.

International career
Tesillo was named in Colombia's provisional squad for Copa América Centenario but was cut from the final squad. On 15 July, he was included in the 18-man squad ahead of the 2016 Summer Olympics.

Tesillo appeared in all four matches during the tournament, as his side was knocked out by eventual champions Brazil in the quarterfinals.

In May 2018, he was named in Colombia's preliminary 35 man squad for the 2018 World Cup in Russia. However, he did not make the final cut to 23. On June 28, 2019, his missed penalty kick in the shootout, saw Colombia eliminated by Chile in the 2019 Copa America quarterfinals.

Career statistics

Club

International goals
As of match played 3 June 2019 Scores and results list Colombia's goal tally first.

Honours
Junior
 Copa Colombia: 2015

León
 Liga MX: Guardianes 2020
 Leagues Cup: 2021

Individual
 Liga MX Best XI: Guardianes 2020, Apertura 2021
 Liga MX All-Star: 2021

References

External links

1990 births
Living people
Sportspeople from Barranquilla
Colombian footballers
Association football central defenders
Categoría Primera A players
Categoría Primera B players
Centauros Villavicencio footballers
Deportes Quindío footballers
Atlético Junior footballers
Independiente Santa Fe footballers
Colombian expatriate footballers
Expatriate footballers in Mexico
Club León footballers
Liga MX players
Footballers at the 2016 Summer Olympics
2019 Copa América players
2021 Copa América players
Olympic footballers of Colombia
Colombia international footballers